The men's canoe slalom C-1 competition at the 2016 Olympic Games in Rio de Janeiro took place between 7 and 9 August at the Olympic Whitewater Stadium.

The gold medal was won by Denis Gargaud Chanut of France.

Schedule 
All times are Brasília Time (UTC−3).

C-1 slalom men

References 

Men's slalom C-1
Men's events at the 2016 Summer Olympics